Tahj James Rodney Minniecon is an Indigenous Australian soccer player who most recently played for Davao Aguilas FC in Philippines Football League in 2018.

Early life
Tahj James Rodney Minniecon grew up in Brisbane and went to Cavendish Road State High School and Carbrook State School. He is of Indigenous Australian heritage. One of his junior clubs was Loganholme Lightning Football Club.

Club career

Queensland Roar
Minniecon was signed by the Roar from the AIS in 2007. On signing a two-year deal he said, "This is my home-town club and ever since the A-League started I always wanted to start my career with Queensland Roar. My family and friends are in Brisbane and I can’t wait to get started".

Gold Coast United
On 3 January 2009, it was revealed that Minniecon had signed with new A-League franchise Gold Coast United for their inaugural season in the A-League. Minniecon was set for a trade with Newcastle Jets striker Chris Payne, however the move fell through when Minniecon suffered a heel injury during a youth league game against Sydney FC.

Western Sydney Wanderers
After spending time on trial with Western Sydney Wanderers he completed the signing of a one-year contract on 8 August 2012. Minnecon was the Wanderer's first Indigenous player.

Rockdale City Suns
After being released by Western Sydney, Minniecon signed a short-term contract with NSW NPL1 club Rockdale City.

Meralco Manila

On 1 December 2014, it was announced that Minniecon had signed a 1-year deal plus extension with Filipino-based club Loyola Meralco Sparks in an attempt to get his career back on track. On 15 February 2015, Minniecon made his debut and scored his first goal for Loyola in a 2–3 away win against Manila Jeepney in the 2015 United Football League.

The club changed their name to FC Meralco Manila when it joined the Philippines Football League in 2017. However the club was dissolved in January 2018 after playing in the inaugural season leaving Minniecon without a club.

Career statistics

1 - includes A-League final series statistics
2 - includes FIFA Club World Cup statistics; AFC Champions League statistics are included in season commencing after group stages (i.e. ACL in A-League seasons etc.)

Honours

Club
Gold Coast United:
 National Youth League Championship: 2009-2010

Western Sydney Wanderers
 A-League Premiership: 2012–13

International
Australia:
 AFF U19 Youth Championship: 2008

References

External links
 Western Sydney Wanderers profile
 FFA - Young Socceroos profile

1989 births
Living people
Sportspeople from Cairns
Soccer players from Queensland
Australian soccer players
Indigenous Australian soccer players
A-League Men players
Western Sydney Wanderers FC players
Brisbane Roar FC players
Gold Coast United FC players
Australian Institute of Sport soccer players
Rockdale Ilinden FC players
F.C. Meralco Manila players
Australian expatriate soccer players
Australian expatriate sportspeople in the Philippines
Expatriate footballers in the Philippines
Association football wingers
Association football forwards